A Web of Sound is the second album by the American garage rock band the Seeds. Produced by Marcus Tybalt and released in October 1966, it contained the single "Mr. Farmer" and the 14-minute closing song "Up In Her Room". The album did not chart, though it has received generally favorable reviews from music critics.

Background and release
Lead singer Sky Saxon conceptualized the album's cover design depicting the four Seeds members trapped in a spider's web. A Web of Sound was produced by Saxon under the pseudonym Marcus Tybalt; Saxon also wrote or co-wrote all of the songs on the album (two credited under the Tybalt alias), as well as the liner notes. Side one consists of six tracks, beginning with the single "Mr. Farmer" and continuing with other garage rock-sounding songs, most of them short in duration. 
Side two contains only two songs, including the 14-minute closer "Up In Her Room", which features bottleneck guitar, electric fuzz-bass, electric piano, tambourine, and drums.

Released in October 1966, A Web of Sound did not receive much attention in the United States for several months until after the band's "Pushin' Too Hard", a song from their self-titled debut album, was re-released and entered the Billboard Hot 100 singles chart.

Reception 

Pete Johnson, in a 1967 Los Angeles Times review, stated that with A Web of Sound, the Seeds had "been adopted by the hippies – the flower children – because of their open-ended songs which generally skirt neatly plotted thoughts and didacticism." Some contemporary music critics compare album track "Up In Her Room" to The Velvet Underground song "Sister Ray", which was released a year later. 
In the book All Yesterdays' Parties: The Velvet Underground in Print, 1966–1971, author Clinton Heylin wrote that "both songs work much the same way [...] listening to them is humming in a room where another dozen people are humming also, in a constant pitch, never varying, unchanging".

AllMusic's Joe Viglione suggested that A Web of Sound also influenced such artists as Iggy Pop and the Stooges and Alice Cooper. Stewart Mason, also of Allmusic, remarked that the album blended "the snotty aggression of [The Seeds] a bit with some heavier psychedelic flourishes". Writer Malcolm Russell described A Web of Sound as being "more adventurous" than the band's debut album, and said it "brimmed with scratchy mid-60s classics". 
Don Jacobson of The Beachwood Reporter called it "one of the all-time craziest mid-60s pioneering rock 'n' roll records". 
Researcher/author Martin C. Strong wrote that the album is "full of weird, psychotic blues highlighting [Saxon's] demented vocal sermonizing on such reliable topics as sex, drugs, and rock 'n' roll".

Track listing

Side One

Side Two

Personnel
 Rick Andridge – Drums
 Darryl Hooper – Keyboards, organ, piano, backing vocals
 Jan Savage – Guitars, backing vocals
 Sky Saxon – Lead vocalist, bass guitar
 Cooker – Slide guitar
 Harvey Sharpe – Bass guitar
Dave Hassinger, Raphael Valentin - engineers

References

1966 albums
GNP Crescendo Records albums
The Seeds albums